Antoine Batisse (born 13 January 1995) is a French professional footballer who plays as a defender or midfielder for Pau FC. He has previously played for Chamois Niortais and Boulogne.

Career
Batisse was born in Versailles, a suburb of Paris, but grew up in the west of France. He joined Niort as a youngster in 2009, having previously played for nearby La Rochelle. He graduated through the club's youth system and was awarded his first professional contract ahead of the 2014–15 season. Batisse made his debut for Niort in the 2–1 home win over Angers on 26 September 2014, playing the entire match. The midfielder was also involved in the side's run to the last 32 of the Coupe de France that season, featuring in victories against Chauvigny and Genêts Anglet.

Career statistics

References

External links
 

1995 births
Living people
Sportspeople from Versailles, Yvelines
French footballers
Association football midfielders
Chamois Niortais F.C. players
US Boulogne players
Pau FC players
Ligue 2 players
Championnat National players
Footballers from Yvelines
Sportspeople from Charente-Maritime
Footballers from Nouvelle-Aquitaine